Mary Evelyn Parker (November 28, 1920 – January 17, 2015) was an American education, newspaper editor, and politician who served as the Treasurer of Louisiana from 1968 to 1987. She was the first woman to serve in the position.

Early life and education 
Mary Evelyn Dickerson was born in Fullerton, Louisiana. Her father, Racia Dickerson, worked at a saw mill and her mother, Addie née Graham Dickerson, was a homemaker. She studied at Northwestern State University, where she competed on the debate team.

Career 
She taught English and edited the Oakdale Journal before her career in public office. She also worked as a real estate agent.

She narrated gubernatorial candidate Earl Long's speeches on the radio for his campaign in 1948.

She succeeded A. P. Tugwell as Louisiana State Treasurer in 1968. She resigned as State Treasurer in 1987 was succeeded by Mary Landrieu.

Death 
She died at her home in Baton Rouge at age 94.

References

1920 births
2015 deaths
20th-century American businesswomen
20th-century American businesspeople
20th-century American educators
20th-century American newspaper editors
20th-century American politicians
American real estate brokers
Northwestern University alumni
People from Vernon Parish, Louisiana
Schoolteachers from Louisiana
State treasurers of Louisiana
Teachers of English
Women in Louisiana politics
Women newspaper editors
Women state constitutional officers of Louisiana
20th-century American women educators
20th-century American women politicians
21st-century American women